Frogmore is a village in the Southern Tablelands of New South Wales, Australia. It was previously a mining town.

Mining history

Copper was first discovered and mined in Frogmore in the 1850s, but mining has not continued since 1907, despite further exploration since the 1950s. Silver and tungsten have also been mined around Frogmore.

In the 1870s, there were two copper mines operating in Frogmore — the Deer Brothers mine and the Bensusan mine. Copper was also mined north west of Frogmore.

In 1882, quartz reef gold was found to the north of  Frogmore, resulting in a minor rush to stake claims, but there were no significant gold mines in the area.

Community and facilities
Frogmore had a public school from 1875 to 1982. The village has an Anglican church, a Uniting church (formerly Methodist), and a Catholic church, St John the Baptist, with a Catholic cemetery in its grounds. There is also a general cemetery.

The community hall was burned down in a bushfire in 1997, and fundraising for its replacement included a Pass the hat around concert by Lee Kernaghan. There is a rural fire station on the site of the old hall and the new hall is adjacent to it.

In the 2016 census, Frogmore's population was 132, which had grown to 146 in 2021.

Climate
Frogmore has a climate intermediate between that of the South Eastern Highlands and South West Slopes, most similar to Yass. Diurnal range is generally high year round, but markedly lesser in winter due to greater cloud cover. Precipitation peaks slightly in winter.

References

Towns in New South Wales
Hilltops Council
Mining towns in New South Wales